Callidula sumatrensis is a moth of the  family Callidulidae. It is found in Sundaland and Thailand. Its habitat consists of lowland forest.

It is a day-flying species.

References

Callidulidae
Moths described in 1887